Lucie Hradecká and Renata Voráčová were the defending champions, but Voráčová chose not to participate, and only Hradecká competed that year. Hradecká partnered up with Andreja Klepač, but they lost in the quarterfinals to Vera Dushevina and Ekaterina Makarova.

Anabel Medina Garrigues and Virginia Ruano Pascual won the tournament, defeating Dushevina and Makarova in the final, 6–4, 6–1.

Seeds

Draw

External links 
 Draw

2008 Doubles
Banka Koper Slovenia Open - Doubles